"Cool Down the Pace" is the final single from Mattafix's debut album, Signs of a Struggle, released in 2006. The song charted in Germany, Italy, Austria, and Switzerland. The original song was sung by Gregory Isaacs and was released on his 1982 album Night Nurse.

Track listing

Digital download
"Cool Down the Pace" (Radio Version)

CD single
"Cool Down the Pace" (Radio Version)
"Cool Down the Pace" (Phatt Reggaeton Remix)

EP
"Cool Down the Pace" (Radio Version)
"Cool Down the Pace" (Extended)
"Cool Down the Pace" (Fem Fem's Funkateriamix)
"Cool Down the Pace" (Sly & Robbie Mix)
"Cool Down the Pace" (Cass & Mangan Remix)
"Cool Down the Pace" (Seiji Remix)
"Cool Down the Pace" (Phatt Reggaeton Remix)
"Cool Down the Pace" (OD Hunte Remix) (featuring Jim Screech)

Charts

References

2006 singles
1982 songs
Virgin Records singles
Mattafix songs